The Seventh Army Symphony Orchestra was the only symphonic orchestral ensemble ever created under the supervision of the United States Army. Founded by the composer Samuel Adler, its members participated in the cultural diplomacy initiatives of the United States in an effort to demonstrate the shared cultural heritage of the United States, its European allies and the vanquished countries of Europe during the post World War II era.

History
The Seventh Army Symphony  Orchestra was established as part of the Seventh United States Army based in Stuttgart, Germany in 1952. It was founded by the young conductor Samuel Adler who also served as its first principal conductor while stationed as a Corporal in the 2nd Armored Division during the Cold War. The orchestra's membership consisted of professionally educated musicians who were also enlisted within the Army during the 1950s and early 1960s.

During the course of a decade, the orchestra concertized extensively throughout the ruins of war-torn Europe as part of the cultural diplomacy initiatives of the United States in the aftermath of World War II. In addition to bolstering the morale of America's enlisted troops, the orchestra was established in order to demonstrate the shared cultural values and musical heritage which united the citizens of America with their counterparts throughout Europe. 
The orchestra's performances were well received by audiences and included tours within West Germany, Denmark, France, Greece, Italy and the United Kingdom from 1952 until 1962.

Under Samuel Adler's musical direction, the orchestra incorporated a repertoire consisting of selections from the major symphonic repertoire of classical music including works by Ludwig van Beethoven and Johannes Brahms.    
In later years, it also sought to share America's musical heritage with European audiences by showcasing the talents of leading American composers including: Roy Harris, Leroy Anderson and Morton Gould. These concerts proved to be quite popular among civilians and military personnel alike.  General Dwight Eisenhower even praised the orchestra as the "greatest thing for American-German relations" since the end of World War II.  While serving as the United States High Commissioner to Germany on the Allied High Commission, James B. Conant also praised the orchestra for promoting cultural understanding between the German and American people. Adler received a special Citation of Excellence from the Army for forming the 7th Army Symphony Orchestra and its success in Europe between 1952 and 1961.

Over the years, members of the orchestra participated in several historic performances. During the orchestra's inaugural concert on July 5, 1952, in Heidelberg, members of the orchestra performed during the farewell festivities for NATO's Supreme Allied Commander General Dwight D. Eisenhower. In December 1955 they served as the first American orchestra to participate in a live radio broadcast on German radio under the baton of Ronald Ondrejka. Several years later in 1957, they debuted on the German television network in Berlin under the direction of Ling Tung and participated in the program "Week of Light Music" which was broadcast on South German Radio to Europe and the United States. In 1958, the orchestra also concertized at the Brussels World's Fair under the direction of Edward Lee Alley.

As the reconstruction of Europe advanced during the 1950s, performances by the orchestra were no longer deemed to be necessary. Recruitment within the Army for the orchestra was curtailed after 1962.

Radio broadcasts 
In addition to providing concerts for audiences throughout Europe, the Seventh Army Orchestra also concertized over the radio. Performances by the orchestra were shared with all members of the United States armed forces over the Armed Forces Radio Service.

Conductors
Over the years, various noted musicians conducted the Seventh Army Orchestra including:
1952–1953 Samuel Adler
1953–1954 James Dixon, Andrew Heath
1953–1955 Kenneth Schermerhorn
1954–1956 Ronald Ondrejka
1955–1956 Henry Lewis
1956–1958 Ling Tung
1957–1959 Nico Snel
1958–1960 Edward Lee Alley, Howard Wassermann – Assistant Conductor
1959–1960 John Ferritto, John Canarina
1960–1961 Arthur Shettle, Ralph Lane
1960–1962 Reid Bunger
1961–1962 Thomas Lewis, John Covelli

Notable members
Jim Hughart
Ben Patterson, double bassist
Doug Sax, trumpet
Don Ellis, trumpet

References

Further reading

External links
 Website

1952 establishments in West Germany
1962 disestablishments in West Germany
American Forces Network
Bands of the United States Army
Cultural diplomacy
Disbanded American orchestras
Military bands located outside their country of origin
Military units and formations of the United States in the Cold War
Military units and formations established in 1952
Military units and formations disestablished in 1962
Musical groups established in 1952
Musical groups disestablished in 1962
Organisations based in Stuttgart
United States military in Stuttgart